Thorius grandis, commonly known as the grand minute salamander, is a species of salamander in the family Plethodontidae. It is endemic to Mexico where it is found in west-central Sierra Madre del Sur in Guerrero. Its natural habitats are pine-fir and pine-oak-fir forests; it tolerates some habitat modification. It usually occurs under logs or the bark of fallen rotting logs. It is threatened by habitat loss caused by logging and expanding agriculture.

References

Thorius
Endemic amphibians of Mexico
Fauna of the Sierra Madre del Sur
Taxonomy articles created by Polbot
Amphibians described in 1999